Bollklubben Häcken, more commonly known as BK Häcken or simply Häcken, is a Swedish professional football club based in Gothenburg. It currently plays in Allsvenskan, the top tier of Swedish football. Formed on 2 August 1940, Häcken has played sixteen seasons in Allsvenskan, debuting in the league in 1983.

The club is affiliated to Göteborgs Fotbollförbund and play their home games at Bravida Arena. The club colours, reflected in their crest and kit, are yellow and black.

History

The beginning
The club was started by a group of 14- to 15-year-old youngsters, and they had a wish to not just play football for fun but to create an organisation and play in the national league system. The boys turned to Göteborgs Fotbollförbund, the local FA, the boys had been playing under the name BK Kick earlier.  However, the name was already taken by another organisation, the name was then changed to Bollklubben Häcken after the huge hedge (sv: häck) which grew around the field the boys used to practise on. The organisation Bollklubben Häcken came into existence on 2 August 1940.

First decades
Following the first years the club only played sporadic matches, youth championships and a few other matches, but eventually they started to play at the senior level. As of 1943 the club started to take in the league system and success came in an instant. Between 1944 and 1947 the club won their league and climbed from west seniorclass 4 to seniorclass 1.

The start of the 1950s went as well as the 1940s had. The club won Division 4 in 1950 and when they won Division 3 in 1951 they went from a local club to be known as a "comet team" in the national media. The club fought for a place in Allsvenskan in 1953 but saw themselves defeated by Kalmar FF, and in 1954 the club was relegated from Division 2. In 1955 the club set the record for the most spectators during a Division 3 game against IK Oddevold, when 18,229 people showed up for the game. BK Häcken eventually won the league but returned soon again and played in Division 3 for the rest of the decade.

The 1960s started with the opening of the club's new clubhouse, now known as Häckensborg. Häcken spent most of the decade as a stable Division 3 team, but in 1967 they were relegated to Division 4 and it was struck by some severe economical and internal problems.

The 1970s started just as badly as the previous decade ended. The club fell out of Division 4 and held discussions with IF Warta about a merger. A discussion had been up several times earlier but had not gone as far as now, at the day of the voting the IF Warta members voted for a merging while the BK Häcken members voted against it. In 1971 the club won Division 5, the club then played in Division 4 until 1975 when they won it and in 1977 they won Division 3 with former Swedish international Agne Simonsson as manager, when the club earlier won Division 3 in 1951 they climbed directly up to Division 2, however this time they had to play a qualifier against IK Brage, Motala AIF and Degerfors. The club won and took the step up to Division 2. During 1978–79 the club played successfully in Division 2 with a 3rd place as the best position. In 1978 BK Häcken also started a ladies team.

Reaching Allsvenskan
The new decade started as strong as the last one ended, Agne Simonsen continued to bring success to the club as they won Division 2 and qualified for a position in Allsvenskan, however IF Elfsborg proved too strong with a 0–1 home defeat at Gamla Ullevi and then a 1–1 result in Borås at Ryavallen. However, during the game at Gamla Ullevi, BK Häcken sets the club record for biggest home audience with 19 205.
However the club was not let down by this and came in 2nd place in 1982 and this time they qualified for the promotion play-offs against IFK Norrköping, BK Häcken is able to reach a 2–0 result home at Rambergsvallen and then achieve a 1–1 away at Idrottsparken in Norrköping and the club reached Allsvenskan for the first time in club history.
The time that BK Häcken spends in Allsvenskan is however short, the club's successful manager Agne Simonsen leaves for a local competitor and Reine Almqvist takes over, the club ends up last in the league and is relegated back to Division 2 where they play for the rest of the 1980s.

BK Häcken starts the 1990s with winning Division 1 söder and faces GIF Sundsvall in the promotion play-offs, and despite an impressive 5–2 victory at home for Häcken, Sundsvall is able to come back in and win the match in Sundsvall and gets promoted to Allsvenskan. The club was also successful plying in Svenska Cupen and reaches the final, but are defeated again, this time 3–0 by Djurgårdens IF.
The club is close in reaching Allsvenskan again in 1991, but a 2–2 home and 1–1 away sees them losing the position to Helsingborgs IF.
1992 is more successful as they reach Allsvenskan through a 4th place in Kvalsvenskan and this time the spell in the top league is not as short as earlier, BK Häcken ends up on in 6th place in 1993 and gets to play a second year in Allsvenskan, however the club ends up last in the league in 1994 and following some turbulence on the leadership side of the club it stays in Division 1 until 1997 as the club ended up in 2nd place and qualifies for the play-offs against Västerås SK, with a 1–1 home and with a 4–2 away BK Häcken climbs up to Allsvenskan again.
The club is however relegated again in 1998 after ending up second last, but returns in 1999 after winning Division 1 Södra, this year Kim Källström also makes his debut for the club.

New millennium
The new millennium continues as the last decade did, the club is able to defend its Allsvenska position in a relegation/promotion play-off against Mjällby AIF in the end of the 2000 season after penalties, Kjell Pettersson leaves the club and Torbjörn Nilsson takes over as manager.
2001 BK Häcken plays its sixth season overall in Allsvenskan but ends second last and is relegated to Superettan, through a cooperation with Floda BoIF future Liberian national Dulee Johnson arrives at the club and in 2002 and he gets company from Jimmy Dixon and Dioh Williams.
BK Häcken stays in Superettan until 2004, being close to take the step up both in 2002, failing on goal difference, and in 2003, defeated by GIF Sundsvall in the play-offs, in 2004 the clubs reaches Allsvenskan by winning Superettan.
The club brings in former Swedish international Teddy Lučić and Danish international Stig Tøfting in 2005 in an attempt to reach a higher position the earlier, the club reaches 8th places.
The 2006 season gets harder as Stig Tøfting and Dulee Johnson leaves the club and the club is forced to play against a qualify against IF Brommapojkarna, BK Häcken is defeated by a total of 4–1 and is relegated to Superettan.

In 2010, Häcken earned the Fair Play award for the Allsvenskan. This resulted in the team earning a spot in the 1st Qualifying Round of the 2011–12 UEFA Europa League when Sweden won third place in the UEFA Fair Play ranking.

In 2012, BK Häcken finished second in Allsvenskan, which is their best performance in the league so far. During this season, the Ghanaian striker Waris Majeed scored 23 goals, which made him the Allsvenskan top scorer of the year. In 2016, Häcken secured their first main title, as they beat Malmö FF in the final of the Svenska Cupen, and won the cup title. In 2019, Häcken secured their second main title, as they beat AFC Eskilstuna in the final of the Svenska Cupen with 3–0 at Bravida Arena.

The club won the 2022 edition of Allsvenskan, becoming Swedish champions for the first time in their history.

Rivalries

Häcken's main rivals are the three other main Gothenburg teams IFK Göteborg, GAIS and Örgryte IS, with IFK being considered the biggest rival.
A lesser rivalry also consists between Häcken and IF Elfsborg from Borås, as well as with some teams from the island of Hisingen in the names of IF Warta and Hisingsbacka FC, especially between the younger sections of the teams.

Honours

Leagues
Allsvenskan
Champions: 2022
Runners-up: 2012

Superettan
Champions: 2004
Runners-up: 2008

Division 1 Södra:
Champions (2): 1990, 1999
Runners-up: 1997

Division 1 Västra
Champions: 1992

Cups
Svenska Cupen
Winners (2): 2015–16, 2018–19
Runners-up: 1989–90, 2020–21

European record

Accurate as of 29 July 2021

Legend: GF = Goals For. GA = Goals Against. GD = Goal Difference.

Players

First-team squad

Out on loan

Retired numbers
2 – Johan Lind, defender (1995–2010)

Managers
 Sven-Agne Larsson (1958–59)
 Agne Simonsson (1977–82)
 Reine Almqvist (1983, 1989–93)
 Jan Sjöström (1984–86)
 Stefan Lundin (1989–91)
  (1996–00)
 Torbjörn Nilsson (2001)
 Jörgen Lennartsson (2002–04)
 Stefan Lundin (2005 – Sept 06)
 Reine Almqvist (Sept 2006–07)
  (2007–09)
 Peter Gerhardsson (2009–16)
 Mikael Stahre (2017)
 Andreas Alm (2018–21)
 Per-Mathias Høgmo (2021–)

Footnotes

References

External links

 BK Häcken – official site
 Supporterklubben Getingarna – official supporter club site
 Sektion G – supporter site

 
Allsvenskan clubs
Football clubs in Gothenburg
Association football clubs established in 1940
1940 establishments in Sweden
Football clubs in Västra Götaland County
Svenska Cupen winners